Douglas Bullis is an American author. His work includes 100 Artists of the West Coast.

Bibliography
Remembrances of Things to Come Publisher: Atelier Books, Ltd. Co. September 29, 2011, 152 pages
Indigo (2008)
AmericaAmerica When Will You See . Publisher: Atelier Books, Ltd. Co. Published February 11, 2008, Pages: 52
100 Artists of the West Coast, Schiffer Publishing, Atglen, Pennsylvania (2006)
Mahavamsa: The Great Chronicle of Sri Lanka (editor and commentary) 1999 Jain Publishing Company. 
Culture Shock Succeed in Business Sri Lanka with Hiru Biljani
Sri Lankan Cooking (with Wendy Hutton)
The Longest Hajj: The Journeys of Ibn Battuta (2000)
Fashion Asia (September 2000)
Doing Business in Today's India January 1998, Praeger 
Preparing for Electronic Commerce in Asia Publisher ABC-CLIO Published February 28, 1999  Subject Management & Business: General, published in Westport by Greenwood Press
Sri Lanka (1998)
Selling to India's Consumer Market (1997)
Write a Winning Business Plan 1996
Crystals: the science, mystery and lore
The Chania Town News: Timeless People in a Changing Time (2001)
California fashion designers: art and style (1987)
Preparing for Electronic Commerce in Asia 
Not by Bread Alone: The Thousand Years of the French Revolution (1989)
50 West Coast Artists: A Critical Selection of Painters... with Henry Hopkins (1981)
A Soul You Can See: The Life and Thinking of Chief Minister Datuk Patinggi Tan Sri Haji Abdul Taib Mahmud of Sarawak Encorp Group Sdn Bhd, (1996) - Prime ministers - 248 pages
Why New Mexicans Love New Mexico with Diane Freburg (Editor)
Morning Light by Nancy King, Douglas Bullis (Editor)

Articles
The Longest Hajj: The Journeys of Ibn Battuta — Saudi Aramco World article by Douglas Bullis (July/August 2000).

References

Further reading
Book review blog by Douglas Bullis

American male writers
Living people
Year of birth missing (living people)